DG Justice, Freedom and Security was split in 2010. For Home Affairs (security), see Directorate-General for Home Affairs (European Commission).

The Directorate-General for Justice and Consumers (DG JUST) is a Directorate-General of the European Commission. The role of the body is to ensure that the whole European Union (EU) is an area of freedom, security and justice. The specific tasks and responsibilities of the DG are laid down by the Treaty of Rome (see Part Two, Articles 17–22; Part Three, Title III, Articles 39–47), the Treaty of Amsterdam which came into force on 1 May 1999 and the conclusions of the European Council meeting in Tampere (Finland) in October 1999.

The relevant Commissioner is the European Commissioner for Justice, Consumers and Gender Equality (formerly European Commissioner for Justice, Fundamental Rights and Citizenship), currently Commissioners Didier Reynders and Helena Dalli. The current Director-General is Ana Gallego Torres.

Structure

As of 2015, the DG Justice and Consumers is divided into 5 directorates, namely :

Directorate A : Civil justice
Directorate B : Criminal justice
Directorate C : Fundamental rights and Union citizenship
Directorate D : Equality
Directorate E : Consumers

DG Justice and Consumers is responsible for relations with the following EU agencies : the EU Agency for Fundamental Rights (FRA), the European Institute for Gender Equality (EIGE) and the European Union Judicial Cooperation Unit (EUROJUST).

History
DG JUSTICE was created in 2010 when the DG Justice, Freedom and Security was split into DG JUSTICE and the Directorate-General for Home Affairs.

See also
European Commissioner for Justice
Directorate-General for Home Affairs
European Commissioner for Home Affairs
Justice and Home Affairs Council (Council of the European Union)
Directorate-General for Justice and Home Affairs
European Parliament Committee on Civil Liberties, Justice and Home Affairs
Area of freedom, security and justice
Charter of Fundamental Rights of the European Union
Four Freedoms
European Court of Justice
Court of First Instance
European Union Civil Service Tribunal
European Convention on Human Rights
European Court of Human Rights
Universal Declaration of Human Rights
International Covenant on Civil and Political Rights
International Covenant on Economic, Social and Cultural Rights
Police and Judicial Co-operation in Criminal Matters
Eurojust
European Union Agency for Fundamental Rights (FRA)
European Institute for Gender Equality (EIGE)
Acquis communautaire

References

External links
DG Justice

Justice